Davida (minor planet designation: 511 Davida) is a large C-type asteroid. It is the one of the largest asteroids; approximately tied for 7th place, to within measurement uncertainties, and the 5th or 6th most massive. It was discovered by R. S. Dugan in 1903. Davida is named after David Peck Todd, an astronomy professor at Amherst College.

Physical characteristics 

Davida is approximately 270–310 km in diameter and comprises an estimated 1.5% of the total mass of the asteroid belt. It is a C-type asteroid, which means that it is dark in colouring with a carbonaceous chondrite composition.

From 2002 to 2007, astronomers at the Keck Observatory used the Keck II telescope, which is fitted with adaptive optics, to photograph Davida. The asteroid is not a dwarf planet: there are at least two promontories and at least one flat facet with 15-km deviations from a best-fit ellipsoid. The facet is presumably a 150-km global-scale crater like the ones seen on 253 Mathilde. Conrad et al. (2007) show that craters of this size "can be expected from the impactor size distribution, without likelihood of catastrophic disruption of Davida."

Mass 
In 2001, Michalak estimated Davida to have a mass of  kg.  In 2007, Baer and Chesley estimated Davida to have a mass of  kg.  , Baer suggests Davida has a mass of  kg. This most recent estimate by Baer indicates that Davida is approximately tied with 704 Interamnia as the fifth-most-massive asteroid, though the error bars of Interamnia are large.

Occultations 
There have been 9 occultation events observed since 1987, many of which produced two or three chords. Two examples shown here.

Notes

References

External links 

 Asteroid occultations, IOTA – International Occultation Timing Association (2011)
 Time lapse photography of Davida
 Al Conrad's research page at Keck
 
 

Meliboea asteroids
Davida
Davida
C-type asteroids (Tholen)
C-type asteroids (SMASS)
1903 in science
19030530